A brain stem tumor is a tumor in the part of the brain that connects to the spinal cord (the brain stem).

Symptoms and signs
The symptoms of brain stem tumors vary greatly and can include ataxia, cranial nerve palsy, headaches, problems with speech and swallowing, hearing loss, weakness, hemiparesis, vision abnormalities, ptosis, and behavioral changes. Another possible symptom is vomiting. Headaches related to brainstem tumors may be worse shortly after waking up in the morning.

Diagnosis
An MRI is better than a CT scan when a brainstem tumor is in the differential diagnosis.

Types of brain stem tumors
The most common form of brainstem tumor is the brainstem glioma.

Treatment
Treatment typically consists of radiotherapy and steroids for palliation of symptoms. (Proton Beam Therapy should be included here by someone with good knowledge of it; it is more accurate, and very importantly for pediatric cases, has reduced side effects.) Radiotherapy may result in minimally extended survival time.

Prognosis
Prognosis is very poor, with only 37% of treated patients surviving one year or more. Topotecan has been studied in the treatment of brainstem glioma, otherwise, chemotherapy is probably ineffective, though further study is needed.

References

External links
 Brain stem tumor entry in the public domain NCI Dictionary of Cancer Terms

Nervous system neoplasia